NGC 4535 is a barred spiral galaxy located some 54 million light years from Earth in the constellation Virgo. It is a member of the Virgo Cluster of galaxies and is located 4.3° from Messier 87. The galactic plane of NGC 4535 is inclined by an angle of 43° to the line of sight from the Earth. The morphological classification of NGC 4535 in the De Vaucouleurs system is SAB(s)c, which indicates a bar structure across the core (SAB), no ring (s), and loosely wound spiral arms (c). The inner part of the galaxy has two spiral arms, which branch into multiple arms further away. The small nucleus is of type HII, meaning the spectrum resembles that of an H II region.

During 1999, the Hubble Space Telescope was used to observe Cepheid variable stars in NGC 4535. The period-luminosity relationship for these objects yielded a distance modulus of 31.02 ± 0.26 magnitude. This corresponded to a physical distance estimate of 52.2 ± 6.2 Mly (16.0 ± 1.9) Mpc, which was consistent with distance estimates for other members of the Virgo Cluster.

Gallery

References

External links 
 

Virgo Cluster
Virgo (constellation)
4535
Barred spiral galaxies
41812
7727